Rakhmetovo (Räxmät) is a rural locality (a village) in Baimovsky Selsoviet, Abzelilovsky District, Bashkortostan, Russia. The population was 341 as of 2010. There are 10  streets.

Geography 
Rakhmetovo is located 79 km north of Askarovo (the district's administrative centre) by road. Yaykarovo is the nearest rural locality.

References 

Rural localities in Abzelilovsky District